The Paradelta BiBreak (or Break Bipo) is an Italian two-place paraglider, designed and produced by Paradelta Parma of Parma. It remained in production in 2016.

Design and development
The aircraft was designed as a tandem glider for flight training and as such was referred to as the BiBreak, a two-pace design based on the Paradelta Break. The term "bi", indicates "bi-place" or two seater.

The glider is AFNOR certified.

Specifications (BiBreak)

References

External links

BiBreak
Paragliders